In enzymology, a 1-phosphatidylinositol 4-kinase is an enzyme that catalyzes the chemical reaction

ATP + 1-phosphatidyl-1D-myo-inositol  ADP + 1-phosphatidyl-1D-myo-inositol 4-phosphate

Thus, the two substrates of this enzyme are ATP and 1-phosphatidyl-1D-myo-inositol, whereas its two products are ADP and 1-phosphatidyl-1D-myo-inositol 4-phosphate.

This enzyme belongs to the family of transferases, specifically those transferring phosphorus-containing groups (phosphotransferases) with an alcohol group as acceptor.  The systematic name of this enzyme class is ATP:1-phosphatidyl-1D-myo-inositol 4-phosphotransferase. Other names in common use include phosphatidylinositol kinase (phosphorylating), phosphatidylinositol 4-kinase, phosphatidylinositol kinase, type II phosphatidylinositol kinase, PI kinase, and PI 4-kinase.  This enzyme participates in inositol phosphate metabolism and phosphatidylinositol signaling system.

Structural studies

As of late 2007, the structure has only been solved for this enzyme. Part of the enzyme was crystallized with its activating partner frequenin.

References

 
 
 
 
 

EC 2.7.1
Enzymes of known structure